Lake Madawaska is the headpond of the Arnprior Generating Station (operated by Ontario Power Generation) near the town of Arnprior, Ontario. The lake was created in 1976 by a hydroelectric dam on the Madawaska River just before it joins the Ottawa River.

References

External link
Lake Madawaska on Google Maps

Madawa
Madawaska